{{DISPLAYTITLE:Kappa2 Apodis}}

Kappa2 Apodis (κ2 Apodis) is the Bayer designation for a double star in the southern circumpolar constellation of Apus. The pair have a combined apparent visual magnitude of +5.65, which makes the system faintly visible to the naked eye.

The brighter star has a stellar classification of B7 III-IV, with the luminosity class of III-IV suggesting that it may lie in an intermediate stage between a subgiant and a giant star. The faint companion is a K-type main sequence star with a classification of K0 V. It has a visual magnitude of 12.5 and an angular separation of 15 arcseconds from the brighter member.

See also
 Kappa¹ Apodis

References

External links
 Image κ² Apodis

138800
Apus (constellation)
Apodis, Kappa2
PD-73 01625
Double stars
B-type giants
K-type main-sequence stars
076750
5782